Uhryniv is a railway stop that is located in village of Uhryniv, Ivano-Frankivsk Oblast in Ukraine. It is part of the Ivano-Frankivsk administration (Lviv Railways).

Among the services provided at the station is only embarkment and disembarkment of passengers for commuter and regional lines. There is no loading and unloading of luggage.

!Previous station!!!!Operator!!!!Next Station

External links
 railway stop Uhryniv
 Listing of stations at the Unified network marking

Railway stations in Ivano-Frankivsk Oblast
Lviv Railways stations